John Murray (14 October 1898 – 8 May 1975) was born in Bonar Bridge, Scotland. He was a Scottish-born Calvinist theologian who taught at Princeton Seminary and then left to help found Westminster Theological Seminary, where he taught for many years. He was ordained in the Orthodox Presbyterian Church in 1937.

Life
Murray was born in the croft of Badbea, near Bonar Bridge, in Sutherland county, Scotland. Following service in the British Army in the First World War (during which he lost an eye, serving in the famous Black Watch regiment) he studied at the University of Glasgow. Following his acceptance as a theological student of the Free Presbyterian Church of Scotland he pursued further studies at Princeton Theological Seminary under J. Gresham Machen and Geerhardus Vos, but broke with the Free Presbyterian Church in 1930 over that Church's handling of a discipline case in the Chesley, Ontario congregation concerning the Lord's Day. He taught at Princeton for a year and then lectured in systematic theology at Westminster Theological Seminary to generations of students from 1930 to 1966, and was an early trustee of the Banner of Truth Trust. Besides the material in the four-volume Collected Writings, his primary published works are a commentary on the Epistle to the Romans (previously included in the New International Commentary on the New Testament series but now superseded by Douglas J. Moo's commentary), Redemption Accomplished and Applied, Principles of Conduct, The Imputation of Adam's Sin, Baptism, and Divorce.

Murray preached at Chesley and Lochalsh from time to time until his retirement from Westminster Theological Seminary in 1966. He returned to Scotland, where he was connected with the Free Church of Scotland, and at the age of 69, married Valerie Knowlton 7 December 1967. Writing after a communion season at Lochalsh, Murray said, "I think I feel most at home here and at Chesley of all the places I visit." There had been some consideration that upon leaving the seminary, Murray might take a pastorate in the newly formed Presbyterian Reformed Church, but the infirmity of his aged sisters at the home place necessitated his return to Ross-shire, Scotland.

Works
  ? pages
  ? pages
  192 pages
  272 pages
  ? pages
  736 pages
  ? pages

References

External links
Free audio lectures and sermons in mp3 format from ThirdMill.org
"The Atonement"
"The Reformed Faith and Arminianism" (Part 1) (Part 2) (Part 3)
"Arminianism and the Atonement"
"Irresistible Grace"
"Law and Grace"
"The Covenant of Grace"
"The Sovereignty of God"
"Calvin on the Sovereignty of God"
"Calvin, Dordt and Westminster on Predestination"
"Adoption"
"The Adamic Administration"
"From Faith to Faith"
"The Mode of Baptism" (PDF)
"Pictures of Christ"
"Definitive Sanctification"
"The Weak and the Strong"
"Tradition: Romish and Protestant"
"Preaching: at Chesley Canada"

1898 births
1975 deaths
Orthodox Presbyterian Church members
Orthodox Presbyterian Church ministers
Scottish Presbyterians
Scottish Calvinist and Reformed theologians
Westminster Theological Seminary faculty
Princeton Theological Seminary alumni
Princeton Theological Seminary faculty
People from Sutherland
20th-century Calvinist and Reformed theologians
20th-century American clergy